John Oballa Owaa (born 28 August 1958, Ahero, Nyando District, Kenya) is the bishop of Ngong Diocese in Kenya - consecrated 2012 April, 14 in Ngong. His principal consecrator was John Cardinal Njue.

He was appointed the bishop of Ngong Diocese on by Pope Benedict XVI on 7 January 2012. The Diocese of Ngong remained vacant with the resignation of Bishop Cornelius Schilder, M.H.M. in August 2009.

John did his 'O' levels at St. Peter's Minor Seminary in Mukumu and then did his 'A' levels at Tindinyo College, which has since been turned to a major seminary and theological. 
 
He attended St. Augustine Senior Seminary, Mabanga, from 1980 to 1982, and proceeded to St. Thomas Aquinas National Seminary in Nairobi. On 28 August 1986, his 28th birthday, he was incardinated and ordained a priest for Kisumu (Arch-Diocese), Kenya.

Fr. John Oballa Owaa obtained a licentiate and PhD Degrees in Canon Law at the Pontifical Urban University, Rome. While in Rome, he also worked as an official of the Pontifical Council for Health Pastoral Care between the years 1995 and 1997.

Appointments

Diocese of Ngong
The Diocese of Ngong covers an area of 47,000 square kilometres.
At the time of the appointment of Msgr Oballa, the Diocese of Ngong had an approximated population of 1,011,000 people, with 83,247 Catholics. It had 29 parishes, 53 priests (39 diocesan and 14 religious), 40 religious brothers, 143 sisters and 19 seminarians.

References

External links

1958 births
Living people
21st-century Roman Catholic bishops in Kenya
People from Kisumu County
Roman Catholic bishops of Ngong